"Let Me Go" is a single by American alternative rock band Cake, from their 1998 album Prolonging the Magic.

Track listing

Chart positions

1999 singles
Cake (band) songs
1998 songs
Songs written by John McCrea (musician)
Columbia Records singles